M-4 highway (formerly part of M-18 highway east of Podgorica) is a Montenegrin roadway. It runs concurrently with European route E762.

History
Construction on the M-18 highway finished in 1965. However, asphalt was not applied along the highway until years later.

In January 2016, the Ministry of Transport and Maritime Affairs published bylaw on categorisation of state roads. With new categorisation, M-18 highway was split in two new highways, M-3 highway and M-4 highway.

Major intersections

References

M-4